Shukhendu Shekhar Dutta is a Bharatiya Janata Party politician from Assam. He has been elected in Assam Legislative Assembly election in 1996 from Patharkandi constituency.

References 

Living people
Bharatiya Janata Party politicians from Assam
Assam MLAs 1996–2001
People from Morigaon district
Year of birth missing (living people)